is a Japanese footballer, who currently plays for Júbilo Iwata on loan from Jubilo Iwata.

Career statistics
Updated to 23 February 2016.

References

External links

1984 births
Living people
University of Tsukuba alumni
Association football people from Shizuoka Prefecture
Japanese footballers
J1 League players
J2 League players
Júbilo Iwata players
Avispa Fukuoka players
Association football midfielders
People from Fujieda, Shizuoka